Shelbyoceras is a genus of Cambrian monoplacophora which was one of the genera mistaken for a cephalopod, since the characteristics differentiating monoplacophora from cephalopods are few. Shelbyoceras was reclassified based on a depressed groove that forms a band around the shell, which is similar to a feature seen in Hypseloconus (with whom it may be synonymous). The septa in this genus are either closely  or irregularly spaced.

References

Cambrian animals
Prehistoric monoplacophorans
Cambrian genus extinctions